This is a list of modern conflicts in the Middle East ensuing in the geographic and political region known as the Middle East. The "Middle East" is traditionally defined as the Fertile Crescent (Mesopotamia), Levant, and Egypt and neighboring areas of Arabia, Anatolia and Iran. It currently encompasses the area from Egypt, Turkey and Cyprus in the west to Iran and the Persian Gulf in the east, and from Turkey and Iran in the north, to Yemen and Oman in the south.
 Conflicts are separate incidents with at least 100 casualties, and are listed by total deaths, including sub-conflicts.
 The term "modern" refers to the First World War and later period,  in other words, since 1914.

List of conflicts

Casualties breakdown
[a].Unification of Saudi Arabia (combined casualties 7,989–8,989+)
Battle of Riyadh (1902) – 37 killed.
Battle of Dilam (1903) – 410 killed.
Saudi–Rashidi War (1903–1907) – 2,300+ killed.
Annexation of Al-Hasa and Qatif (1913) – unknown.
Battle of Jarrab (1915) – unknown.
Battle of Kanzaan (1915) – unknown.
First Nejd–Hejaz War, 1918–1919 – 8,392+ killed
Kuwait–Najd War (1921) – 200–800 killed.
1921 Ikhwan raid on Iraq – 700 killed.
Conquest of Ha'il – unknown.
Ikhwan raids on Transjordan 1922–1924 – 500-1,500 killed.
Second Nejd–Hejaz War (1924–1925) – 450 killed.
Ikhwan Revolt (1927–1930) – 2,000 killed.

[p].Middle Eastern theatre of World War I (combined casualty figure 2,825,000–5,000,000) of:
Caucasus campaign
Persian campaign
Gallipoli campaign
Mesopotamian campaign
Sinai and Palestine campaign
Arab Revolt
South Arabia
Armenian genocide – c 1.5 million dead
Assyrian genocide – 150,000–300,000 dead
Great Famine of Mount Lebanon – 200,000 dead

[b].Turkish War of Independence (combined figure 170,500–873,000+):
Greco-Turkish War – 70,000–400,000 casualties
Franco-Turkish War – 40,000 casualties.
Turkish–Armenian War – 60,000–432,500 casualties.
Koçkiri Rebellion – 500 killed.
Revolt of Ahmet Anzavur – unknown.
Kuva-i Inzibatiye revolt – unknown.

[c].Iraqi–Kurdish conflict (combined casualty figure 138,800–320,100) of:
Mahmud Barzanji revolts – unknown.
Ahmad Barzanji revolt (1931) – unknown.
1943 Iraqi Kurdish revolt (1943) – unknown.
First Iraqi–Kurdish War (1961–1970) – 75,000–105,000 killed.
Second Iraqi–Kurdish War (1974–1975) – 9,000 killed.600,000 displaced
PUK insurgency (1976–1978) – 800 killed.
Iraqi Kurdish uprising (1982–1988) – 50,000–198,000 killed.
1991 Uprising in As Sulaymaniyah – 700–2,000 killed.
Iraqi Kurdish Civil War (1994–1997) – 3,000–5,000 killed.
2003 invasion of Iraq – several hundred killed (≈300) on the Kurdish front, at least 24 Peshmerga killed.

[d].Middle Eastern theatre of World War II (combined casualty figure 12,338–14,898+) of:
Anglo-Iraqi War – at least 560 killed.
Farhud 175–780 killed.
Syria–Lebanon Campaign 10,404–12,964 killed.
Anglo-Soviet invasion of Iran 100 – 1,062 killed.
Bombing of Palestine in World War II 137 deaths.
Bombing of Bahrain in World War II – unknown.

[e].Iran crisis of 1946 (combined casualty figure 1,921+):
Azerbaijan People's Republic crisis – 421 killed.
Republic of Mahabad crisis – ≈1,000 killed.
Civil interregnum – 500 killed.

[f].Arab–Israeli conflict (combined casualty figure 76,338–87,338+):
Arab–Israeli War (1948–1949) – 14,400 casualties.
Palestinian Fedayeen insurgency and Retribution operations (1950s) – 3,456 casualties
Suez War (1956) – 3,203 killed.
Israeli–Palestinian conflict (1965–present) – 24,000 killed
Palestinian insurgency in South Lebanon – 2,600–20,000 killed
Operation Litani
1982 Lebanon War
First Palestinian Intifada – 2,000 killed
Al-Aqsa Intifada – 7,000 killed
Gaza–Israel conflict – 3,500+ killed
Six-Day War (1967) – 13,976 killed.
War of Attrition (1967–1970) – 6,403 killed.
Yom Kippur War (1973) 10,000–21,000.

[g].North Yemen Civil War (combined 100,000–200,000 casualties):
1962 Coup d'état
Ramadan offensive
Haradh offensive
1965 Royalist offensive
Siege of Sana'a (1967)

[h].Lebanese Civil War (combined 39,132–43,970+ mortal casualties):
Bus massacre – 27 killed.
Hundred Days' War – 160 killed.
Karantina massacre – 1,000–1,500 killed.
Damour massacre – 684 killed.
Battle of the Hotels – 700 killed.
Black Saturday (Lebanon) – 200–600 killed.
Tel al-Zaatar massacre – 1,778–3,278 killed.
1982 Lebanon War – 28,280 killed.
Sabra and Shatila massacre – 762–3,500 killed.
War of the Camps (1986–1987) – 3,781 killed.
Mountain War – 1,600 killed.
War of Liberation (1989–1990) – unknown.
October 13 massacre – 500–700 killed, 260 civilians massacred.

[i].Consolidation of the Iranian Revolution (combined fatalities count 12,000):
1979 Kurdish rebellion in Iran – 10,171+ killed and executed.
1979 Khuzestan uprising – 112+ killed.
1979 Khorasan uprising – unknown.
1979 Azeri uprising – unknown.
1979 Baluchistan uprising – 50 killed.
Iran hostage crisis – 9 killed.
1979–1980 Tehran clashes – unknown.

[j].Iran–Iraq War (combined death count 645,000–823,000+):
Iraqi invasion 1980
Mujahedin al-Halq uprising 1981–1982
Liberation of Khorramshahr 1982 – 17,000 killed
Operation Undeniable Victory 1982 – 50,000 mortal casualties
Operation Ramadan 1982 – 80,000 killed
Kurdish Rebellion 1983–1988 (including the Al-Anfal Campaign) 50,000–198,000 killed
Operation Before the Dawn 1983 – 6,000+ killed
Operation Dawn 3 – 162,000 killed
Operation Dawn 5 1984 – 50,000 killed
Operation Dawn 6 1984 – unknown
Operation Khaibar 1984 – 49,000 killed
Tanker War 1984
Operation Badr (1985) – 30,000–32,000
War of the Cities 1985–1987
Operation Dawn-8 1986 – unknown
Operation Karbala-4 1986 – 15,000 killed
Operation Karbala-5 – 85,000 killed
Operation Nasr 4 – unknown
Operation Karbala-10 – unknown
Operation Mersad 1987 – 4,900 killed
1988 executions of Iranian political prisoners 2,000 – 30,000 executed

[k].Iraq War 2003–2011 (combined casualty figure of 192,361–226,056+):
2003 invasion of Iraq – 35,000 killed
Iraqi insurgency (2003–06) – 15,000 killed
Civil war in Iraq 2006–2008 – 30,000–40,000 killed
Iraqi insurgency (2008–2011) – 5,000–10,000 killed
Withdrawal of U.S. troops from Iraq – ≈1,000 killed
Iraqi insurgency (post-U.S. withdrawal) – 54,000+ killed
Iraqi Civil War (2014–2017) – 53,361–72,056 killed

[l].Sectarian conflict in Mandatory Palestine (combined casualties 7,813)
1921 Jaffa riots – 95 killed
1929 Palestine riots – 251 killed.
1933 Palestine riots – 20 killed.
Arab Revolt in Palestine – 5,000 killed.
Jewish insurgency in Palestine (1944–47) – 338 British and around 100 Palestinian Jews killed.
1947–48 Civil War in Mandatory Palestine – 2,009 killed by 1 April 1948.

[m].Egyptian Crisis (combined casualties 5,000+)
Egyptian Revolution of 2011 – 846 killed
Sinai insurgency – 2,800+ killed

[n].Syrian Civil War (combined casualties 270,000–450,000)
 Civil uprising phase of the Syrian Civil War –
 Early insurgency phase of the Syrian Civil War –
 2012–13 escalation of the Syrian Civil War – 
 Inter-rebel conflict during the Syrian Civil War – 5,641–6,991 killed
 ISIL expansion
 Foreign involvement in the Syrian Civil War
US-led intervention in the Syrian Civil War
Russian intervention in the Syrian Civil War
 Battle of Aleppo and Operation Euphrates Shield
 Eastern Syria campaign (September–December 2017)
 Idlib demilitarization (2018–present)
 Northwestern Syria offensive (April–August 2019) and 2019 Turkish offensive into north-eastern Syria

[o].Iran–Israel proxy conflict (combined casualties ≈2,000)
2006 Lebanon War – 1,641 killed
Iran–Israel proxy conflict during the Syrian Civil War – several dozen killed

See also

 Arab Spring
 British foreign policy in the Middle East
 List of Middle East peace proposals

References

External links
 U.S. Involvement in Middle Eastern Conflicts from the Dean Peter Krogh Foreign Affairs Digital Archives (archived 12 March 2012)
 Geopolitical perspective of a "new era" in the Middle East

Military lists
Lists of wars by region
 
History-related lists
Conflicts, Middle East, Modern
Modern
21st-century military history
Conflicts in 2022